Obrosovo is the name of several rural localities in Russia:
Obrosovo, Tver Oblast, a village in Obrosovskoye Rural Settlement of Molokovsky District in Tver Oblast
Obrosovo, Sokolsky District, Vologda Oblast, a village in Borovetsky Selsoviet of Sokolsky District in Vologda Oblast
Obrosovo, Vologodsky District, Vologda Oblast, a village in Kubensky Selsoviet of Vologodsky District in Vologda Oblast